The Ministry of Labor and Social Affairs of Armenia is a republican body of executive authority, which elaborates and implements the policies of the Government of Armenia in the labor and social security sectors.

Former ministers 
Ashot Yesayan
Rafayel Bagoyan
Hranush Hakobyan
Gagik Yeganyan
Razmik Martirosyan
Aghvan Vardanyan
Arsen Hambardzumyan
Gevorg Petrosyan
Mkhitar Hambardzumyan
Arthur Grigoryan
Artem Asatryan
Mane Tandilyan
Zaruhi Batoyan

See also 
 Social protection in Armenia

References

External links 
 

Labor and Social Affairs
Ministries established in 1918
Armenia
Armenia
1918 establishments in Armenia